The EuroCup Basketball Coach of the Year is an annual award of EuroCup Basketball, which is the secondary level European-wide professional club basketball league, that is given to the player that EuroCup Basketball deems its "top rising star". The EuroCup Basketball League is the European-wide professional basketball league that is one tier level below the top-tier EuroLeague. The award began in the EuroCup Basketball 2008–09 season.

EuroCup Basketball Coaches of the Year

 There was no awarding in the 2019–20, because the season was cancelled due to the coronavirus pandemic in Europe.

See also
EuroLeague Coach of the Year

References

External links
EuroCup Basketball Official Web Page

Awards
European basketball awards